José Ángel Carmona Navarro (born 29 January 2002) is a Spanish professional footballer for La Liga club Elche, on loan from Sevilla. Mainly a right back, he can also appear as an center back.

Club career
Born in El Viso del Alcor, Seville, Andalusia, Carmona was a Sevilla FC youth graduate. He made his senior debut with the reserves on 21 November 2020, playing the last nine minutes in a 2–1 Segunda División B away win over Córdoba CF.

On 20 July 2021, Carmona renewed his contract until 2025. He made his first team – and La Liga debut – on 13 March of the following year, replacing Marcos Acuña in a 1–1 away draw against Rayo Vallecano. 

On 11 January 2023, Carmona joined fellow La Liga club Elche on loan until the end of the season.

Career statistics

Club

References

External links
 
 

2002 births
Living people
People from Seville (comarca)
Sportspeople from the Province of Seville
Spanish footballers
Footballers from Andalusia
Association football fullbacks
La Liga players
Primera Federación players
Segunda División B players
Tercera División players
Sevilla FC C players
Sevilla Atlético players
Sevilla FC players
Elche CF players
Spain under-21 international footballers